William Wesley Cates, is an American philosopher, photographer, writer and vintner (September 17, 1939 – March 25, 2018)
BA in Philosophy  from Roanoke College in Virginia and a  MA in Theatre Arts from Hollins University. His novel The Growing Season won a Los Angeles Book Festival fiction award in 2015.

During his time in Santa Ynez, California, together with his wife Gwen Cates, started Tantara Winery. In 2013, Tantara Winery Pinot Noir was included in National Geographic's “The Ten Best of Everything.”

Books
 The Growing Season, Calavira Publishing, 2014
 Upon A Fine Horse, Calavira Publishing, 2011
 The Unlimited Salad Bar, Calavira Publishing, 2009
 Once Upon A Time At Loch Ness & other stories, Booklocker, 2008 
 Just The Right Woman, iUniverse, 2006

References

External links
 Calavira Publishing
 Amazon author page

1939 births
2018 deaths
Roanoke College alumni
Hollins University alumni
American philosophers
American photographers
American winemakers
People from Santa Barbara County, California